Glenda Reiser, (16 June 1955 – 6 January 2008) was a Canadian middle-distance runner.

She was born in Ottawa and was a member of the Ottawa Kinsmen Harriers. She switched from swimming to track and field aged 15. She then progressed very rapidly in the sport and excelled as a junior, running the 1500 metres in 4 minutes 15.9 seconds. She competed in the inaugural women's 1500 metre Olympic event at the 1972 Summer Olympics in Munich, where she finished second in her heat with a time of 4 minutes 6.7 seconds to Lyudmila Bragina who broke the world record. Reiser's time was a World Junior Record. She was then eliminated in the semifinals. On September 15, 1973 Glenda broke the world record for the women's mile. At the summer Universiade held in Moscow in 1973, Glenda took home a silver medal in the 1500 metres. She also took a silver medal in the 1500 metres, and a bronze medal in the 800 metres at 1973 Pacific Conference Games in Toronto; where she had a tight finish with Mary Decker (USA) and Charlene Rendina (Aus), in which all 3 medalist finished within 1/10 of a second of one  other. She was the three time Canadian 1500-metre champion, won a gold medal at the distance at the 1974 Commonwealth Games in Christchurch, New Zealand breaking the games record twice along the way. She died aged 52 after a long illness.

Glenda still holds the Canadian junior records at 800 meters, 1000 metres, 1500 metres, and the mile more than 40 years after setting the records.

References

1955 births
2008 deaths
Canadian female middle-distance runners
Athletes from Ottawa
Commonwealth Games gold medallists for Canada
Commonwealth Games medallists in athletics
Athletes (track and field) at the 1974 British Commonwealth Games
Olympic track and field athletes of Canada
Athletes (track and field) at the 1972 Summer Olympics
Universiade medalists in athletics (track and field)
Universiade silver medalists for Canada
Medalists at the 1973 Summer Universiade
Medallists at the 1974 British Commonwealth Games